Table tennis TT6–10 men's singles at the 2018 Commonwealth Games was held at the Oxenford Studios on the Gold Coast, Australia from 10 to 14 April.

Group stage

Group 1

Group 2

Knockout stage

References

Men's TT6-10 singles